Michael Stanley Kemp Chattey  (born 9 January 1961) has been the head of fundraising at the Conservative Party since 2001. He was the deputy of Mick Davis, 

In June 2016, Chattey was awarded an OBE in David Cameron's resignation honours list for "political service" in his role as head of fundraising.

Chattey has been married to Charlotte Vere since 2016.

Responsibilities
Chattey, as head of fundraising, has responsibility for the donation and fundraising efforts of the Conservative Party.

He conducts his role of head of fundraising from the party's central office, known as CCHQ in the Treasurer's Department.

Early life
Chattey was educated at Milton Abbey School in Dorset between 1974 and 1979, before attending the University of North Carolina at Chapel Hill in 1980, followed by the University of the West of England from 1980 to 1984, gaining a 2:1 in business studies.

Career
Chattey spent two years as regional salesman in the southwest for Calor Gas. He then moved to London to start a 15-year career in advertising, predominantly for Evans Hunt Scott and Leo Burnett Advertising, working on South African Airways, COI, Kelloggs, Procter & Gamble, McDonald's, Kodak, Sun Alliance and Commodore Computers. He was hired by Lord Ashcroft in 2002 to join The Conservative Party's Treasurers' Department. He was promoted to head of fundraising in 2012.

References

1961 births
British political consultants
Living people
University of North Carolina at Chapel Hill alumni
People educated at Milton Abbey School
Officers of the Order of the British Empire
Spouses of life peers